Julian Thomas Munby (born January 1954) is an archaeologist and fellow of the Society of Antiquaries of London known for his studies of the archaeology, buildings and landscapes of Oxfordshire and elsewhere. He was educated at Magdalen College School, Oxford, and UCL Institute of Archaeology. He is Head of Buildings Archaeology at Oxford Archaeology.

Selected publications

Roman Life and Art in Britain. 1977. (With Martin Henig) (British Archaeological Reports British Series)
"J. C. Buckler, Tackley's Inn and three medieval houses in Oxford", Oxoniensia, 43, 1978, 123–69.
"Crown-post and king-strut roofs in south-east England", Medieval Archaeology, 27, 1983, 123–35.
Excavations at Portchester Castle IV: Medieval, the Inner Bailey. Society of Antiquaries of London, 1985.  (With Barry Cunliffe)
Portchester Castle. English Heritage, London, 1990. 
The Tree-Ring Dating of the Round Tower, Windsor Castle, Berkshire. English Heritage, London, 2003. (With D. W. H. Miles & D. Haddon Reece) (Centre for Archaeology report)
Stokesay Castle. English Heritage, London, 2005. 
Edward III's Round Table at Windsor: The House of the Round Table and the Windsor Festival of 1344. Boydell Press, 2007. (With Richard Barber and Richard Brown) (Arthurian Studies)

References

External links
Julian Munby talking about The Architecture of New College, Oxford.

Fellows of the Society of Antiquaries of London
English archaeologists
1954 births
Living people